The Duke of Slavonia, also Duke of Dalmatia and Croatia and sometimes Duke of "Whole Slavonia", Dalmatia and Croatia was a title of nobility granted several times in the 13th and 14th centuries, mainly to relatives of Hungarian monarchs or other noblemen. The title of duke signified a more extensive power than that of the Ban of Slavonia or Ban of Croatia.

List of Dukes
 Álmos (1084-1095)
 Stephen III (1147-1162)
 Béla III (1162-1172)
 Emeric (1194-1196)
 Andrew II (1198-1204)
 Béla IV (1220-1226)
 Coloman (1226-1241)
 Denis Türje (1241-1245)
 Stephen V (1245-1257)
 Béla (1260-1269)
 Ladislaus IV (1270-1272)
 Andrew (1274-1278)
 Andrew III (1278-1290)
 Tomasina Morosini (1290-1300)
  (1300-1301)
 Stephen (1353-1354)
 Charles of Durazzo (1371-1376)
 John (with his mother Margaret) (1354-1356)
 John Corvinus (1490-1494)

See also
Ban of Slavonia
Ban of Croatia
List of rulers of Croatia

References

Sources

Hungarian royalty
History of Slavonia
 
Medieval Croatia